The Joan & Sanford I. Weill Medical College of Cornell University is Cornell University's biomedical research unit and medical school in New York City. It is affiliated with NewYork-Presbyterian Hospital, Weill Cornell Medical Center, Hospital for Special Surgery, Memorial Sloan Kettering Cancer Center, and Rockefeller University, all of which are located nearby on York Avenue.

Memorial Sloan Kettering Cancer Center and Rockefeller University joined Weill Cornell to establish the Tri-Institutional MD–PhD Program in 1991. In 2001, the school opened a campus in Qatar. Weill Cornell has also been affiliated with Houston Methodist Hospital since 2004. On September 16, 2019, Weill Cornell Medicine announced students who qualify for financial aid would attend debt-free.

Weill Cornell Medicine enrolls approximately 100 students per class from a pool of over 6,000 applicants, interviewing 700-750 applicants. For the class of 2022, the average undergraduate GPA and MCAT scores for successful applicants were 3.85 and 518, respectively. As of 2022, Weill Cornell Medical College is currently tied for 14th on U.S. News & World Reports ranking of "Best Medical Schools: Research".

History

The school was founded on April 14, 1898, with an endowment by Col. Oliver H. Payne. It was established in New York because Ithaca, where the main campus is located, was deemed too small to offer adequate clinical training opportunities. James Ewing was the first professor of clinical pathology at the school, and for a while was the only full-time professor.James B. Murphy James Ewing Biographical Memoir National Academy of Sciences Washington D.C., 1951.

A branch of the school operated in Stimson Hall on the main campus. The two-year Ithaca course paralleled the first two years of the New York school. It closed in 1938 due to declining enrollment.

Weill Cornell became affiliated with New York Hospital, now NewYork–Presbyterian Hospital, in 1913. The institutions opened a joint campus in Yorkville in 1932.

In 1927, William Payne Whitney's $27 million donation led to the building of the Payne Whitney Psychiatric Clinic, which became the name for Cornell's large psychiatric effort. Its Training School for Nurses became affiliated with the university in 1942, operating as the Cornell Nursing School until it closed in 1979.

In 1936, the Swiss professor and psychiatrist Oskar Diethelm started to build up the Oskar Diethelm Historical Library, a collection of more than 10,000 titles related to the history of psychiatry and a project to which he donated his own library collection and mainly committed after the retirement, while visiting public libraries across America and Europe.

In 1998, New York Hospital merged with Presbyterian Hospital, the affiliate hospital of Columbia University College of Physicians and Surgeons. The combined institution operates today as NewYork–Presbyterian Hospital. Despite the clinical alliance, the faculty and instructional functions of the Cornell and Columbia units remain largely distinct and independent. Each hospital in the NewYork–Presbyterian Healthcare System is affiliated with one of the two colleges.

Originally called Cornell University Medical College', the school was renamed the Weill Medical College of Cornell University after receiving a substantial endowment from then-Citigroup Chairman Sanford I. Weill in 1998. In 2015, the school renamed itself Weill Cornell Medicine to better reflect its mission.

On September 16, 2019, Augustine M.K. Choi announced Weill Cornell Medicine would make the cost of attendance free for all students who qualify for financial aid, made possible by a $160 million gift from The Starr Foundation, directed by Weill Cornell Medicine Overseer Maurice R. Greenberg, in partnership with gifts from Joan and Board of Overseers Chairman Emeritus Sanford I. Weill.

Weill Cornell Medical College founded the medical fraternity Phi Delta Epsilon on October 13, 1904.

Notable alumni

Iqbal Mahmoud Al Assad, pediatric cardiologist
Robert Atkins, creator of the Atkins Diet
Hilary Blumberg, professor of psychiatric neuroscience 
Carlos Cordon-Cardo, physician and scientist
John P. Donohue, physician and testicular cancer researcher
Mario Gaudino, cardiac surgeon and coronary revascularization expert
Anthony Fauci, director of the National Institute of Allergy and Infectious Disease
John Gartner, psychotherapist; author; former Johns Hopkins University Medical School professor; founder or dutytowarn.org PAC 
Wilson Greatbatch, inventor of the cardiac artificial pacemaker
Nan Hayworth, physician and former U.S. Representative
Henry Heimlich, physician and namesake of the Heimlich maneuver
Roy S. Herbst, oncologist, lung cancer researcher, and academic, Yale Cancer Center and Yale School of Medicine
Richard Hooker, surgeon and writer
John Howland, pediatrician
Mae C. Jemison, former astronaut
C. Everett Koop, former Surgeon General
Bonnie Mathieson, scientist and HIV/AIDS researcher
Alton Meister, scientist and HIV/AIDS researcher
Elizabeth Nabel, president of Brigham and Women's Hospital
Utthara Nayar, cancer researcher at the at the Dan-Farber Cancer Institute 
James Peake, former United States Secretary of Veterans Affairs
Jacob Robbins, endocrinologist at the National Institutes of Health
Ida S. Scudder, medical missionary in India
Ruth Westheimer (see below)

Notable faculty

Lewis C. Cantley, Meyer Director and Professor of Cancer Biology at the Sandra and Edward Meyer Cancer Center at Weill Cornell Medicine
Mario Gaudino, professor of cardiothoracic surgery, principal investigator of the ROMA trial, a multinational trial of radial artery grafting in CABG
 Amos Grunebaum (born 1950), obstetrician and gynecologist
David Hajjar, Professor of Pathology and Biochemistry; Frank Rhodes Distinguished Professor of Cardiovascular Biology and Genetics
Ben Kean, Professor of Medicine, founder of the Tropical Medicine Unit (1962) and chief of the Parasitology Laboratory, New York Hospital; personal physician to the Shah of Iran, his treatment of whom led to the Iran Hostage Crisis in 1979-1981.
Otto F. Kernberg, psychiatrist
 Bruce Lerman, cardiologist; the Hilda Altschul Master Professor of Medicine at Weill Cornell Medical College, Chief of the Division of Cardiology and Director of the Cardiac Electrophysiology Laboratory at Weill Cornell Medicine and the New York Presbyterian Hospital
Fabrizio Michelassi, the Lewis Atterbury Stimson Professor, and Chairman of the Department of Surgery at Weill Cornell Medicine
John P. Moore, virologist and professor at Weill Cornell Medicine
Rajiv Ratan, professor, administrator, and scientist; the Burke Professor of Neurology and Neuroscience at Weill Cornell Medicine
Douglas Scherr,  surgeon, medical researcher and Clinical Director of Urologic Oncology at Weill Cornell Medicine 
Harold E. Varmus, Nobel Prize-winning scientist; the Lewis Thomas University Professor of Medicine at Weill Cornell Medicine
David Kissane, Professor of Psychiatry (2003–2012); concurrently Chairman, Department of Psychiatry and Behavioral Sciences and inaugural Jimmie C. Holland Chair in Psychiatric Oncology at Memorial Sloan Kettering Cancer Center
Radu Lucian Sulica, Professor and Chief, Laryngology and Voice Disorders
 Ruth Westheimer (born Karola Siegel, 1928; known as "Dr. Ruth"), German-American sex therapist, talk show host, author, professor, Holocaust survivor, and former Haganah sniper.

See also
 Weill Cornell Graduate School of Medical Sciences
 Tri-Institutional MD–PhD Program
 List of Ivy League medical schools

References

External links
 Official website

NewYork–Presbyterian Healthcare System
Academic health science centres
Colleges and schools of Cornell University
NewYork–Presbyterian Hospital
Schools of medicine in New York City
Universities and colleges in Manhattan
Educational institutions established in 1898
1898 establishments in New York City

Ivy League medical schools
Cornell University campuses
Satellite campuses
Cornell University